Nisterau is an Ortsgemeinde – a community belonging to a Verbandsgemeinde – in the Westerwaldkreis in Rhineland-Palatinate, Germany.

Geography

Location
The community lies in the Westerwald between Limburg and Siegen. Nisterau belongs to the Verbandsgemeinde of Bad Marienberg, a kind of collective municipality. Its seat is in the like-named town.

Constituent communities
Nisterau's Ortsteile are Bach and Pfuhl.

History
About 1300, Pfuhl had its first documentary mention, with Bach's name first appearing in writing in 1416. Both were once independent communities, but were united on 1 March 1969.

Religion
Fifty-six percent of Nisterauers are Evangelical and 14.7% are Catholic.

Politics

Municipal council
The municipal council is made up of 12 council members who were elected in a majority vote in a municipal election on 13 June 2004.

Coat of arms
The tinctures and the charge of the lion in the community's arms refer to the community's former allegiance to the Duchy of Nassau and the later Prussian province of the same name. Also, the two waves symbolize the Große Nister and Kleine Nister, brooks that also form the community's natural boundaries.

Economy and infrastructure

Running right near the community is Bundesstraße 414, leading from Driedorf-Hohenroth to Hachenburg. The nearest Autobahn interchange is Haiger/Burbach on the A 45 (Dortmund–Hanau), some 20 km away. The nearest InterCityExpress stop is the railway station at Montabaur on the Cologne-Frankfurt high-speed rail line.

References

External links
 Nisterau 

Municipalities in Rhineland-Palatinate
Westerwaldkreis